Lenga is a mukim in Muar District, Johor, Malaysia.

Geography
Lenga has 7,264 people which spreads across 292 km2 of land.

References

Mukims of Muar District
Towns, suburbs and villages in Muar
Muar District